This is a list of holidays in New Caledonia.

List

References

New Caledonia
New Caledonia